Paul Gerstgraser (born 22 May 1995) is a retired Austrian nordic combined skier who competed internationally with the Austrian national team.

He competed at the FIS Nordic World Ski Championships 2017 in Lahti, Finland.

References

1995 births
Living people
Austrian male Nordic combined skiers
FIS Nordic World Ski Championships medalists in Nordic combined
Nordic combined skiers at the 2012 Winter Youth Olympics